The Motorola i835w is a phone in the Motorola i835 series.

References

I835w